Ecuador–Russia relations are the bilateral foreign relations between Ecuador and Russia.  Both nations are members of the United Nations.

Ecuador was one of the countries that offered Edward Snowden political asylum while he was in Moscow's Sheremetyevo Airport.

Resident diplomatic missions
 Ecuador has an embassy in Moscow.
 Russia has an embassy in Quito.

See also 
 List of ambassadors of Russia to Ecuador

References

External links 

 Ecuadorian embassy in Moscow
 Russian embassy in Quito

 
Russia
Bilateral relations of Russia